B75 or B-75 may refer to:
 Bundesstraße 75, a German road
 Cobb Highway, in New South Wales, Australia, designated B75
 Intel Ivy Bridge Chipset
 Sicilian Defense, Dragon Variation, according to the Encyclopaedia of Chess Openings
 Sutton Coldfield, according to the list of postal districts in the United Kingdom
 Thor (rocket)
 HLA-B75, an HLA-B serotype